Ivan "Ivica" Bek (29 October 1909 – 2 June 1963), also known as Yvan Beck, was a Serbian football player.

He was part of Yugoslavia's team at the 1928 Summer Olympics and at the 1930 FIFA World Cup.

Club career
Bek was born to a German father, and a Czech mother in the Serbian capital Belgrade borough of Čubura. At age of 16, started playing in BSK Belgrade for which he scored 51 goals in 50 matches. In 1928, Bek moved to Mačva, and soon proceeded to French FC Sète. In his first season, he reached the cup finals, but lost 2–0 against Montpellier. Next year in cup finals against RC France, was victorious for Sète (3–1) with Bek scoring two decisive goals  in extra time. Four years later with the same club, Bek was part of the first team that win the Double in France. Bek helped Yugoslavia get fourth place in the first FIFA world cup in Uruguay. Bek and his team went on a train from Belgrade to Marseille. When they came to Marseille they went on a crew ship to Uruguay in the second class.

International career
Internationally, Bek represented the Kingdom of Yugoslavia (seven caps, four goals) and France (five caps).  For Yugoslavia he debuted in 1927 against Bulgaria (2–0), participated Olympic tournament in 1928 in Amsterdam and played in the 1930 FIFA World Cup for Yugoslavia scoring three goals. In 1933, Bek took French citizenship and renamed himself Yvan Beck and in February 1935 he was picked for the first time for the Equipe Tricolore.

International goals
Scores and results list Yugoslavia's goal tally first, score column indicates score after each Bek goal.

Post-playing career
During the Second World War, Bek was a member of the French Resistance. After the war, he worked as a dockworker in Sète, where he died from a heart attack.

Honours
FC Sète
 Champion of France: 1934
 French Cup: 1930, 1934

References

External links
 
 
 
 
 Yvan Beck at the French Football Federation 

1909 births
1930 FIFA World Cup players
1963 deaths
Footballers from Belgrade
French footballers
France international footballers
Yugoslav footballers
Yugoslavia international footballers
Olympic footballers of Yugoslavia
Serbian people of German descent
Serbian people of Czech descent
French people of German descent
French people of Czech descent
Yugoslav emigrants to France
Serbian emigrants to France
Footballers at the 1928 Summer Olympics
Dual internationalists (football)
OFK Beograd players
FK Mačva Šabac players
Yugoslav First League players
FC Sète 34 players
AS Saint-Étienne players
Nîmes Olympique players
Ligue 1 players
Association football forwards
French Resistance members
Pays d'Aix FC players
Naturalized citizens of France
People from Sète
Sportspeople from Hérault
Footballers from Occitania (administrative region)